Abryna obscura is a species of beetle in the family Cerambycidae. It was described by Bernhard Schwarzer in 1925. It is known from Taiwan and Japan.

Subspecies
 Abryna obscura obscura Schwarzer, 1925
 Abryna obscura oshimensis Breuning, 1955
 Abryna obscura uniformis Breuning & Ohbayashi, 1966

References

Pteropliini
Beetles described in 1925